State Route 754 (SR 754) is a two-lane north–south state highway that runs within Holmes County, Ohio.

Route description
All of SR 754 is located within the north central portion of Holmes County.  The state highway is not inclusive within the National Highway System, a system of routes determined to be most important for the nation's economy, mobility and defense.

History
SR 754 came into being in 1962 along its current alignment, replacing what was previously designated as a portion of SR 77 prior to the designation of I-77 in Ohio. The current route has been a part of the state highway system since 1937 when it was the northernmost section of SR 234. Within one year, the route had been redesignated SR 77. By 1953, the entire route had been paved after being a gravel road since its inclusion within the system. Except for its renumbering, no major changes have taken place to the routing of SR 754 since its inception.

Major intersections

References

754
Transportation in Holmes County, Ohio